Columbine Country Club is a premier private country club, located in Columbine Valley, Colorado a southern suburb minutes away from downtown Denver.  Established in 1955, the club and property is home to an 18-hole championship course originally designed by Henry Hughes, a links-style 9-hole par three course designed by von Hagge, Smelak, & Baril, seven tennis courts, and a family pool complex.  In 1967, Columbine was chosen to host the PGA Championship, where Don January beat out legends of the game Arnold Palmer and Jack Nicklaus to win the 49th edition of the major championship event.

In 2020 the par-72 golf course measures 7,427 yards from the championship tees.  In 2018, the club hired nationally recognized architect Rees Jones and co-designer Greg Muirhead to redesign and renovate the golf course.  In 2017, Columbine Country Club completed a $20-million 45,000 square foot construction of its new clubhouse facilities.

1967 PGA Championship

The 1967 PGA Championship was the 49th edition of this major, staged by the PGA of America.

 Winner: Don January, 281
 Where it was played: Columbine Country Club in Columbine Valley, Colorado
 Tournament dates: July 20–24, 1967
 Leader after first round: Dave Hill, 66
 Leader after second round: Tommy Aaron, 135
 Leader after third round: Dan Sikes, 209

Notable Notes: The last 18-hole playoff to take play in a PGA Championship happened here, and it was Don January who emerged the winner. January and Don Massengale tied for the 72-hole lead at 281, one stroke better than Jack Nicklaus and third-round leader Dan Sikes. In the playoff, January won by two strokes with a 69. It was January's only win in a major (he lost the 1961 PGA Championship in a playoff).

References

Buildings and structures in Arapahoe County, Colorado
Golf clubs and courses in Colorado
1955 establishments in Colorado
Sports venues completed in 1955